Jayabahu II (also known as Vira Parakramabahu) was King of Kotte in the fifteenth century, who ruled from 1467 to 1472/3. He is the grandson of Parakramabahu V and son of Prince Nallurthan of Jaffna Kingdom and Princess Ulakudaya Devi. He succeeded Parakramabahu VI as king of Kotte and was succeeded by Bhuvanekabahu VI.

See also
 List of Sri Lankan monarchs
 History of Sri Lanka

References

External links
 Kings & Rulers of Sri Lanka
 Codrington's Short History of Ceylon

Monarchs of Kotte
1470s deaths
Year of birth unknown
House of Siri Sanga Bo
J
J